Les Monts-Ronds is a commune in the Doubs department in Bourgogne-Franche-Comté in eastern France. It is the result of the merger, on 1 January 2022, of the communes of Mérey-sous-Montrond and Villers-sous-Montrond.

See also
Communes of the Doubs department

References

Communes of Doubs
2022 establishments in France
States and territories established in 2022